Kindiba is an ancient iron extraction site located in Tougo Department, Yatenga Province, Burkina Faso. The site consists of mines and three clay built furnaces.

World Heritage Status
This site was added to the UNESCO World Heritage Tentative List on April 9th, 1996 in the Cultural category.

Notes

Burkinabé culture